Vasily Vasilyevich Bukanov (Russian: Василий Васильевич Буканов; 1898-???) was a Russian and Soviet jurist. He participated in the Russian civil war. 1919-1948 worked in the justice branch. Chairman of the Moscow oblast court, participant of the World War II, member of the Supreme Court of the USSR, chairman of the 1st department of special cases of the okrugs and fronts, vicechairman of the 1st department of the Soviet troops in Germany.

Soviet jurists
1898 births
Year of death missing